General Sir Alexander George Hamilton Harley,  (born 3 May 1941) is a retired British Army officer and former Adjutant-General to the Forces.

Military career
Educated at Caterham School, Alexander Harley was commissioned into the Royal Artillery in 1962. He was mentioned in despatches for services in Northern Ireland in 1978. He was appointed Commanding Officer of 19th Regiment Royal Artillery in 1979, Commander of 33rd Armoured Brigade in 1985 and Assistant Chief of Staff Operations for the Northern Army Group in 1988. He went on to be Assistant Chief of Defence Staff in 1990 and Commander of British Forces Cyprus and Administrator of the Sovereign Base Areas in 1993.

Harley became Deputy Chief of the Defence Staff (Commitments) in 1995 and Adjutant-General to the Forces in 1997 before he retired in August 2000. He was appointed an Officer of the Order of the British Empire in the 1981 Queen's Birthday Honours and a Companion of the Order of the Bath in the 1991 Queen's Birthday Honours.

Retirement
In 2001 he became Master Gunner, St. James's Park, a post he gave up in 2008. In retirement he also became an advisor to Thales Air Systems and a vice-president of Raleigh International.

Family
In 1967 he married Christina Valentine Butler-Cole and they went on to have two sons.

References

|-

|-
 

|-

 
|-

 

1941 births
People educated at Caterham School
British Army generals
Knights Commander of the Order of the British Empire
Companions of the Order of the Bath
Living people
Royal Artillery officers
British military personnel of The Troubles (Northern Ireland)